The 2018 Hardee's Pro Classic was a professional tennis tournament played on outdoor clay courts. It was the eighteenth edition of the tournament and was part of the 2018 ITF Women's Circuit. It took place in Dothan, United States, on 16–22 April 2018.

Singles main draw entrants

Seeds 

 1 Rankings as of 9 April 2018.

Other entrants 
The following players received a wildcard into the singles main draw:
  Sophie Chang
  Ashley Kratzer
  Katerina Stewart

The following players received entry from the qualifying draw:
  Francesca Di Lorenzo
  Deniz Khazaniuk
  Marine Partaud
  Camilla Rosatello

Champions

Singles

 Taylor Townsend def.  Mariana Duque Mariño, 6–2, 2–6, 6–1

Doubles
 
 Alexa Guarachi /  Erin Routliffe def.  Sofia Kenin /  Jamie Loeb, 6–4, 2–6, [11–9]

External links 
 Official website
 2018 Hardee's Pro Classic at ITFtennis.com

2018 ITF Women's Circuit
2018 in American tennis
Hardee's Pro Classic